The object ZW II 96 (also II Zw 96) is a pair of galaxies that are merging. It is in the constellation Delphinus, about 500 million light-years from Earth.

The shape of the merging galaxies is unusual; a number of powerful young starburst regions hang as long, threadlike structures between the main galaxy cores. The system is relatively luminous, but has not yet reached the late stage of coalescence that is the norm for most ultraluminous systems.

The photograph is from a collection of 59 images of merging galaxies taken by the NASA/ESA Hubble Space Telescope released on 24 April 2008, on the 18th anniversary of its 1990 launch.

References

External links
 

Interacting galaxies
2-96
Delphinus (constellation)
Luminous infrared galaxies
65779